The Test is a 2019 fiction novella by Sylvain Neuvel. An Iranian takes a British immigration test consisting of 25 questions.

References 

2019 Canadian novels
Canadian novellas
St. Martin's Press books